Wenhui Book Review is a state-owned weekly newspaper based in Shanghai, owned by Shanghai United Media Group. It was established on March 2, 1985.

External links
 official website of Wenhui Book Review

Weekly newspapers published in China
Chinese-language newspapers (Simplified Chinese)
Newspapers published in Shanghai
Publications established in 1985
1985 establishments in China

State media